Liao Hsiao-chun (born 19 October 1967 in Xiluo Township, Yunlin County, Taiwan) is a Taiwanese TV presenter. She worked for many television/radio stations, such as TVBS-NEWS, FTV News, TTV, Era News, Voice of Taipei, Super TV and ETTV News. She is most famous for hosting the Chao ji da fu weng game show.

References 

1967 births
Living people
Who Wants to Be a Millionaire?
Taiwanese television news anchors
People from Yunlin County
Fu Jen Catholic University alumni